Sławnikowice  is a village in the administrative district of Gmina Zgorzelec, within Zgorzelec County, Lower Silesian Voivodeship, in south-western Poland, close to the German border.

Geography

History
Keselingswalde was first mentioned in a 1301 deed; with Lusatia it passed from the Bohemian Crown to the Electorate of Saxony upon the 1635 Peace of Prague and by resolution of the Vienna Congress was ceded to the Prussian province of Silesia in 1816.

The manor was held by the noble Tschirnhaus dynasty from 1483 onwards, residing here until 1714. Afterwards, the estates changed hands several times, they were finally acquired by the Witzleben dynasty in 1862. Following World War II east of the Oder-Neisse line fell to the Republic of Poland according to the Potsdam Agreement.

Notable people
Ehrenfried Walther von Tschirnhaus (1651–1708), mathematician, physicist, physician, and philosopher
Georg Mohr (1640–1697), mathematician, died in Kieslingswalde.

References

External links

Villages in Zgorzelec County